The  or Peers School (Gakushūin School Corporation), initially known as Gakushūjo, is a Japanese educational institution in Tokyo, originally established to educate the children of Japan's nobility. The original school expanded from its original mandate of educating the royal family and has since become a network of institutions which encompasses preschool through tertiary-level education.

History
The Peers' School was founded in 1847 by Emperor Ninkō in Kyoto.  Its purpose was to educate the children of the Imperial aristocracy (kuge).
Prior to the disestablishment of the Peerage in 1947, commoners had restricted access to Gakushuin, with limited slots only to the Elementary School and Middle School. In 1947, with the US mandated disestablishment of the Kazoku system, enrollment in Gakushuin was fully opened up to the general public. The administration of the school was transferred to the Ministry of Education at this time.  Prior to 1947, Gakushuin was administered by the Imperial Household Agency.

Precepts
Emperor Ninko had four maxims inscribed on the walls of the Gakushūin building, including
 Walk in the paths trodden by the feet of the great sages. 
 Revere the righteous canons of the empire.  
 He that has not learned the sacred doctrines, how can he govern himself?  
 He that is ignorant of the classics, how can he regulate his own conduct?

The school was moved to Tokyo in 1877. Its new purpose was to educate the children of the modern aristocracy. Members of the Imperial Family continue to study at Gakushūin.

Timeline
 1847: founded as Peers' School 
 1877: the school was established in Tokyo 
 1884: Gakushūin became an Imperial institution.
 1885: Peeresses' School was created
 1947: Gakushūin became a private institution.

Gakushuin Corporation
The present-day Gakushuin Corporation comprises the following institutions:
Gakushuin University
Gakushuin Women's College
Gakushuin Boys' Junior and Senior High School
Gakushuin Girls' Junior and Senior High School
Gakushuin Primary School
Gakushuin Kindergarten

Presidents

Notable alumni and faculty members

Teachers
Kanō Jigorō—taught at Gakushūin
Inagaki Manjirō—taught briefly at Gakushūin

Alumni
 For alumni of Gakushuin University, see: Gakushūin University#Notable alumni

 Imperial House of Japan
 Yoshihito, Emperor Taishō - late 123rd Emperor of Japan
 Hirohito, Emperor Shōwa - late 124th Emperor of Japan
 Nagako, Empress Kōjun, late Empress Dowager of Japan
 Emperor Akihito - Former 125th Emperor of Japan
 Emperor Naruhito - Current 126th Emperor of Japan
 Masahito, Prince Hitachi - brother of Emperor Akihito
 Hanako, Princess Hitachi - wife of the Prince Hitachi
 Fumihito, Prince Akishino - son of Emperor Akihito
 Kiko, Princess Akishino - wife of the Prince Akishino
 Kazuko, Princess Taka - sister of Emperor Akihito
 Shigeko, Princess Teru - sister of Emperor Akihito
 Atsuko, Princess Yori - sister of Emperor Akihito
 Takako, Princess Suga - sister of Emperor Akihito
 Sayako, Princess Nori - daughter of Emperor Akihito
 Nobuhito, Prince Takamatsu - brother of Emperor Shōwa
 Kikuko, Princess Takamatsu - wife of the Prince Takamatsu
 Yasuhito, Prince Chichibu - brother of Emperor Shōwa
 Takahito, Prince Mikasa - brother of Emperor Shōwa
 Yuriko, Princess Mikasa - wife of the Prince Mikasa
 Prince Tomohito of Mikasa - son of the Prince Mikasa
 Princess Yasuko of Mikasa - daughter of the Prince Mikasa
 Princess Masako of Mikasa - daughter of the Prince Mikasa
 Princess Akiko of Mikasa - daughter of Prince Tomohito
 Princess Yōko of Mikasa - daughter of Prince Tomohito
 Norihito, Prince Takamado - son of the Prince Mikasa
 Princess Tsuguko of Takamado - daughter of the Prince Takamado
 Princess Noriko of Takamado - daughter of the Prince Takamado
 Princess Ayako of Takamado - daughter of the Prince Takamado
 Yoshihito, Prince Katsura - son of Prince Mikasa
 Aiko, Princess Toshi - daughter of Emperor Naruhito

 House of Yi
 Lieutenant General Prince Imperial Ui Min
 Prince Yi Geon of Korea
 Prince Yi Gu of Korea
 Prince Yi Kang of Korea
 Prince Yi U of Korea
 Princess Deokhye of Korea

 Others
 Princess Huisheng of Aisin Gioro (Qing ruling family of Imperial China)
 Hayao Miyazaki, Director
 Yoko Ono
 Tarō Asō, former Prime Minister of Japan
 Michihiko Kano
 Yukio Mishima, Author
 Shiono Nanami, Author
 Marina Inoue
 Tetsuya Kakihara
 Yoshinobu Shimamura
 Hisaoki Kamei
 Akiko Kamei
 Keiko Nagaoka
 Yasuko Ikenobo
 Yoshiki Kuroda
 Tokugawa Tsunenari
 Hiroyuki Namba
 Akiko Kobayashi
 Akira Yoshimura, Author
 Yoshiki Tanaka, Author
 Yoshihiko Funazaki, Author
 Yuki Kawauchi, Runner
 Kuniko Asagi
 Mona Yamamoto
 Satomi Ton
 Toshiyuki Hosokawa
 Masakazu Motoki
 Kiyoshi Kodama

In fiction
In the novel Spring Snow by Yukio Mishima, set in the early 1910s, the characters Kiyoaki Matsugae and Shigekuni Honda attend the school.

References

External links
Gakushūin

Gakushuin University
Educational institutions established in 1877
Education in Tokyo
Private schools in Tokyo
1877 establishments in Japan
School Corporations in Japan